Francesco Bassani (29 October 1853 – 26 April 1916) was an Italian geologist and paleontologist who was among the first to identify ichthyosaur fossils from northern Italy.

Bassani was born in Thiene and studied at Vicenza and graduated from the University of Padua where he studied under Giovanni Omboni. He also studied in Paris under Albert Gaudry, Melchior Neumayr and Edward Suess in Vienna and Karl Alfred von Zittel in Munich between 1877 and 1879. He worked for a while in Padua and then moved to Milan in 1883 and collaborated with Antonio Stoppani between 1882 and 1885. He became a director of the institute of geology in Naples in 1887 and worked there until his death. He described numerous fossils from Italian localities including an ichthyosaur from Besano, and described fossil fish from Chiavon with illustrations made by his Dutch-origin wife Everdina Douwes Dekker who he married in 1880. A mineral from Vesuvius was named after him as bassanite in 1906. He died at Capri.

References 

University of Padua alumni
Academic staff of the University of Naples Federico II
Members of the Lincean Academy
1916 deaths
1853 births
Italian ichthyologists
Italian paleontologists
19th-century Italian geologists
20th-century Italian geologists